Aaron Dean could refer to: 

Aaron R. Dean II, United States Army general and Adjutant General of the District of Columbia National Guard
Aaron Dean, former police officer accused of shooting and killing Atatiana Jefferson in Fort Worth, Texas

See also
Erin Dean, American actress